Trichopoda is a subgenus of tachinid flies, commonly known as the feather-legged flies or hairy-legged flies. . They are found in North and South America.

Species
Trichopoda ciliata (Fabricius), 1805
Trichopoda incognita (Blanchard, 1966)
Trichopoda indivisa Townsend, 1897
Trichopoda pilipes (Fabricius), 1805
Trichopoda plumipes (Fabricius), 1805
Trichopoda subdivisa Townsend, 1908

References

External links
 Photographs of Trichopoda pennipes

Phasiinae
Diptera of North America
Diptera of South America
Insect subgenera